Raushan Elahi is a Bangladesh Nationalist Party politician and a Member of the Bangladesh Parliament from a reserved seat.

Career
Elahi was elected to parliament from reserved seat as an Bangladesh Nationalist Party candidate in February 1996.

References

Bangladesh Nationalist Party politicians
Living people
Women members of the Jatiya Sangsad
6th Jatiya Sangsad members
5th Jatiya Sangsad members
2nd Jatiya Sangsad members
Year of birth missing (living people)
20th-century Bangladeshi women politicians